159 (one hundred [and] fifty-nine) is a natural number following 158 and preceding 160.

In mathematics
159 is:

the sum of 3 consecutive prime numbers: 47 + 53 + 59.
a Woodall number.
equal to the sum of the squares of the digits of its own square in base 15.
Only 5 numbers (greater than 1) have this property in base 15, none in base 10.
written CLIX in Roman numeral, which spells a proper noun with multiple meanings.

Given 159, the Mertens function returns 0.

In astronomy
 159 Aemilia is a large Main belt asteroid
 NGC 159 is a galaxy in the constellation of Phoenix
The Saros number of the solar eclipse series which will begin on May 23, 2134 and end June 17, 3378. The duration of Saros series 159 is 1244.0 years, and it will contain 70 solar eclipses
The Saros number of the lunar eclipse series, which will begin on September 9, 2147 and end November 7, 3445. The duration of Saros series 159 is 1298.1 years, and it will contain 73 lunar eclipses
 159P/LONEOS is a periodic comet in the Solar System

In geography
 The state of Georgia has 159 counties
 Sherwood No. 159, Saskatchewan is a rural municipality in Saskatchewan, Canada

In the military
 Aero L-159 ALCA (Advanced Light Combat Aircraft) is a Czechoslovakian-built multi-role combat aircraft in service with the Czech Air Force
  was a United States Navy  during World War II
  was a United States Navy  during World War II
  was a United States Navy  during World War II
  was a United States Navy concrete barge during World War II
  was a United States Navy concrete barge following World War II
  was a United States Navy  during World War II
  was a United States Navy  during World War II

In sports
 In professional darts, 159 is the lowest score a player can achieve with no available checkout.

In transportation
 The Alfa Romeo 159 compact executive car produced from 2005 to 2011
 The Ferrari 159 S racecar
 The Peugeot Type 159 was produced in 1919
The British Rail Class 159, a member of the Sprinter family), is a diesel multiple unit, produced from 1989 to 1993
 London Buses route 159
 TWA Flight 159, a Boeing 707, while on its takeoff roll from Greater Cincinnati Airport, passed Delta Flight 379, a DC-9 on the runway on November 6, 1967

In other fields
159 is also:
 The year AD 159 or 159 BC
 159 AH is a year in the Islamic calendar that corresponds to 775 – 776 CE
 The atomic number of an element temporarily called Unpentennium.
 The chemical element terbium has a stable Isotope of 159 nucleons
 Financial Accounting Standards Board (FASB) Number 159, The Fair Value Option for Financial Assets and Financial Liabilities
159 can be dialled to contact a variety of banks in the United Kingdom directly. This has been implemented as a method of preventing financial scams.

See also
 List of highways numbered 159
 United Nations Security Council Resolution 159
 United States Supreme Court cases, Volume 159

References

External links

 Number Facts and Trivia: 159
 The Number 159
 VirtueScience: 159
 159th Medical Detachment
 Farewell to Routemaster Bus 159

Integers